Plasmodium delichoni is a parasite of the genus Plasmodium subgenus Novyella.

Like all Plasmodium species, P. delichoni has both vertebrate and insect hosts. The vertebrate hosts for this parasite are birds.

Taxonomy
The parasite was first described by Valkiūnas et al. in 2008.

Distribution
This parasite is found in Europe, Asia and Africa.

Hosts
P. delichoni infects the common house martin (Delichon urbicum).

References

delichoni
Parasites of birds